Ileana (also Illeana, Iliana, Eleana, Eliana) is a female given name. It is the feminine form of the male name Elijah. It has been adapted for Romanian, Bulgarian, Macedonian, Italian and Spanish (in Spanish there is also Ilean and in Romanian Ileana). In Romanian it is a form of the name "Helen" (another form is Elena), and a hypocoristic for Ileana is Nuţi (from Elenuţa, Ilenuţa).  In Romanian mythology, Ileana Cosânzeana is a mythological feminine figure represented as a beautiful good-natured princess, embodying the concept of feminine beauty. Ileana or Illeana may refer to:

People

Ileana
 Princess Ileana of Romania (1909-1991)
 Ileana Beltrán, Cuban judoka
 Ileana Cabra, Puerto Rican singer
 Ileana Citaristi, Italian dancer
 Ileana Cosânzeana, figure in Romanian mythology
 Ileana Cotrubaș, Romanian opera soprano
 Illeana Douglas, American actress
 Ileana D'Cruz, Indian-born Portuguese actress
 Ileana Gyulai-Drîmbă-Jenei, Romanian fencer
 Ileana Ongar, former Italian hurdler
 Ileana Ros-Lehtinen, member of the US House of Representatives
 Ileana Salvador, former Italian race walker
 Ileana Sararoiu (1936–1979), Romanian singer
 Ileana Silai, Romanian runner
 Ileana Sonnabend, Romanian art dealer

Iliana
 Iliana Biridakis, Jordanian archer
 Iliana Fox, English-born Mexican actress
 Iliana Hernández, Cuban journalist
 Iliana Ivanova, Bulgarian politician and economist
 Iliana Nikolova, Bulgarian canoe sprinter
 Iliana Ortega, Mexican artist
 Iliana Raeva, Bulgarian gymnast
 Iliana Ruzza, Venezuelan public official
 Iliana Yotova, Bulgarian politician

Places 
 Ileana, a commune in Călăraşi County, Romania
 Ileana, a village in Glodeanu Sărat Commune, Buzău County, Romania
 Ilenuța, a village in Fălești District, Moldova

Fictional characters 
 Illeana Scott, played by Angelina Jolie in Taking Lives

Literature 
 Ileana Cosânzeana, a figure in Romanian folk literature
 Ileana Sinziana, a Romanian fairy tale

See also 
 Eliana (name)
 Elena (name)

References 

Romanian feminine given names
Spanish feminine given names